{{Automatic taxobox
|image = Pareuchelus lecointreae (MNHN-IM-2000-31197).jpeg
|image_caption = Shell of † Pareuchelus lecointreae 
|taxon = Pareuchelus
|authority = O. Boettger, 1907
|synonyms_ref = 
|synonyms = † 'Euchelus (Pareuchelus) O. Boettger, 1907
|display_parents= 3
}}Pareuchelus is an extinct genus of sea snails, marine gastropod mollusks, in the family Liotiidae.

Species
Species within the genus Pareuchelus include:
 † Pareuchelus dautzenbergi Landau, Van Dingenen & Ceulemans, 2017
 † Pareuchelus lecointreae'' (Dollfus & Dautzenberg, 1899)

References

External links
 Boettger, O. (1907). Zur Kenntnis der Fauna der mittelmiocänen Schichten von Kostej im Krassó–Szörényer Komitat (Gasteropoden und Anneliden). III. Verhandlungen und Mitteilungen des Siebenbürgischen Vereins für Naturwissenschaften zu Hermannstadt. 55 (1905): 101-244. Hermannstadt

Liotiidae
Monotypic gastropod genera